Landscape lighting or garden lighting refers to the use of outdoor illumination of private gardens and public landscapes; for the enhancement and purposes of safety, nighttime aesthetics, accessibility, security, recreation and sports, and social and event uses.

Light pollution exacerbated by excessive, misdirected or obtrusive use of light, but even carefully used light fundamentally alters natural conditions. As a major side-effect of urbanization, it is blamed for compromising health, disrupting ecosystems and spoiling aesthetic environments.

History
The public landscape and gardens have been illuminated for as long as interior structures have – for beauty, security, circulation, and social occasions; since ancient times by firelight from wood, candles, and animal-plant oil fells in torches, sconces and lanterns. Since the 17th century's introductions of new interior illumination fuels, the technology has then been used outdoors and in gardens. As systems were developed for power delivery, Gas lighting of the 19th century and electric light of the 20th century became part of exterior functioning and design.

Landscape lighting has a long and colorful history, dating back to times before electricity. For centuries, people have found creative ways to light outdoor spaces for beauty, security, circulation and social events. From ancient times until the 17th century, firelight was used to light up gardens in the form of torches, sconces and lanterns made with wood, candles and animal-plant oils.

In the 17th century, advancements in interior illumination led to many of these technologies being applied outdoors. Gas lighting of the 19th century began to be used for exterior purposes as well. As power delivery systems were developed in the 20th century, electric lights also found their way into gardens and landscapes.

The development of modern landscape lighting technology was also aided by advancements in materials sciences. The introduction of durable plastics and aluminum allowed for more complicated designs that could better withstand changing weather conditions and last longer than traditional materials. In addition to this durability came a degree of energy efficiency that further contributed to the rise of landscape lighting in modern times.

Today's landscape lighting offers a variety of options while still maintaining its core purpose: to create an aesthetically pleasing environment while providing safety and security at night. From floodlights that provide a broad wash of light across an area to spotlights that accentuate particular features or focal points within a garden space, today’s landscape lighting provides plenty of choices when it comes to design considerations.

Advances in LED lighting have further revolutionized outdoor illumination as well; LEDs offer greater efficiency than traditional incandescent bulbs while providing excellent cost savings over time due to their robust lifespans. Solar powered lights are another increasingly popular option due their convenience (no electrical wiring required) as well as environmental benefits from their lack of reliance on fossil fuels during operation.

No matter what type of landscape you are looking to illuminate, there is almost certainly an exterior lighting solution available that fits your needs—a fact which stands as testament to how far landscape lighting technology has come over the centuries since its humble beginnings in firelight from wood and oil fells in torches, sconces and lanterns.

For the modern homeowner, landscape lighting offers a way to add beauty and security to their outdoor space while also providing an additional layer of safety and convenience. The next time you find yourself admiring a well lit garden or yard, remember the history behind it; from ancient times up until today, people have been using light to beautify and protect their exterior spaces—and that trend is likely to continue for many years to come.

Current
Conventionally generated and sourced electricity remains the most used source for landscape lighting in the early twenty-first century. With the combination of increasing demand for more efficient lighting, increasing availability of sustainable designs, global warming considerations, and aesthetic and safety concerns in garden and landscape design the methods and equipment of outdoor illumination have been evolving. The increasing use of LEDs, solar power, low voltage fixtures, energy efficient lamps, and energy-saving lighting design are examples of innovation in the field.

Lighting components
There are many different types of landscape lighting systems, controls and switching, wiring connections, fixture types, functions-purposes-styles, and light sources.
Components can include:
 Power
 connection to main property power source (code and permit determined)
 Transformers (12v and multi-tap transformers)
 Timers
 Light sensor switching (photocells)
 motion sensor switching
 Manual 'light switches'
 automated light switching units-systems
 remote lighting switching - on-property devices, off-site phone or online systems
 Electric wiring
 conduit - underground for line voltage, vulnerable locations, under or in constructed elements-pavements
 cable, wire - underground per codes for line and low voltage, above ground at stake-mounted and tree mounted fixtures.
 Light fixtures - fixed location - line voltage (120 V U.S. or 240 V Europe) and low voltage (12 V U.S.)
 Post mount - column mount
 Address light
 Wall mount
 Ceiling mount - hanging fixture
 Security lights
 Tree lights - up and down lights
 In-grade fixtures- uplights buried in-ground - top flush with surface
 Adjustable aim "bullet" - uplight
 sports court lights - i.e.: tennis courts
 portable fixtures "hard-wired" or "plug-in" 'wet location rated' interior style fixtures
 string lighting - "holiday lights" - bulbs and LED
 Light fixtures - low voltage (12V U.S.) - modest location adjustments
 path lights
 area lights
 uplights (directional, spot, and flood lights)- stake mount
 wall lights - surface mount
 tree-mount lights - down lights
 deck lights - surface mount
 well lights - mounted below grade
 hardscape lights- integrated into walls.
 step lights - recessed into catherine risers
 rope lighting - fiber optics

Underwater

 Water features
 swimming pools
 hot tubs
 plunge pools
 water gardens
 reflecting pools
 fountains
 garden ponds
 constructed streams and waterfalls
 Light sources - underwater
 fixed mount fixtures - i.e.: pool wall light
 movable uplights
 fiber optic lights
 floating fixture lights - rechargeable battery & solar photovoltaic

Upcoming

 DIY - designs in public domain

See also
 Lighting designer
 Garden designer
 Landscape designer
 Landscape architect
 Lighting for the elderly
 Architectural lighting design

References

Further reading
 The Landscape Lighting Book; Janet Lennox Moyer; John Wiley and Sons; 2013;  (cloth)  (ebk.).

Garden features
Lighting
Architectural lighting design
Landscape architecture